The surname Angell may refer to:

In arts and media

Architects
 Edward Angell (1857–1923), American architect
 Frank W. Angell (1851–1943), American architect
 Samuel Angell (1800–1866), British architect and archaeologist
 Thomas Gravely Angell, architect, of Imrie and Angell
 Truman O. Angell (1810–1887), Church Architect for The Church of Jesus Christ of Latter-day Saints

Painters and sculptors
 Carleton W. Angell (1887–1962), American sculptor
 Helen Cordelia Angell (1847–1884), English watercolour painter
 Tony Angell (born 1940), American wildlife artist, environmental educator, and writer

Performers
 Barbara Angell (born 1935), Australian writer and actor
 Jeff Angell (born 1973), American musician
 Jones Angell (born 1979), play-by-play radio announcer
 Katie Angell, Australian trapeze artist and later a musical theatre actress
 Lisa Angell (born 1968), French singer
 Olav Angell (1932–2018), Norwegian writer and jazz musician

Writers
 Barbara Angell (born 1935), Australian writer and actor
 Ernest Angell (1889–1973), American lawyer and author
 Henrik Angell (1861–1922), Norwegian military officer, sportsman, and writer
 Marcia Angell (born 1939), American physician and author
 Norman Angell (1872–1967), British member of parliament, writer, and winner of the Nobel Peace Prize (1933)
 Olav Angell (1932–2018), Norwegian writer and jazz musician
 Roger Angell (1920–2022), fiction editor and regular contributor at The New Yorker
 Tony Angell (born 1940), American wildlife artist, environmental educator, and writer

In other arts
 Danita Angell, American model
 David Angell (1946–2001), American producer of sitcoms
 Peitor Angell, American composer, arranger, lyricist, and record producer

In politics
 Albert Angell (1660–1705), Norwegian civil servant, landowner and businessman
 Alexis C. Angell (1857–1932), American federal judge
 David Angell (diplomat), Canadian diplomat
 Erik Must Angell (1744–1814), Norwegian jurist and politician
 Ernest Angell (1889–1973), American lawyer and author
 Homer D. Angell (1875–1968), Republican U.S. congressman from Oregon
 Norman Angell (1872–1967), British member of parliament, writer, and winner of the Nobel Peace Prize (1933)

In science and academia
 Anna A. Angell (1844–1906), American physician
 Austen Angell (born 1933), chemist
 Emerson C. Angell (1822–1903), American dentist
 Frank Angell (1857–1939), American psychologist
 George Thorndike Angell (1823–1909), founder of the American Humane Education Society, philanthropist, criminologist
 James Burrill Angell (1829–1916), president of the University of Michigan
 James Rowland Angell (1869–1949), psychologist, President of Yale
 Marcia Angell (born 1939), American physician and author
 Martin F. Angell (1878–1930), American football and baseball coach and physics and mathematics professor
 Robert Cooley Angell (1899–1984), American sociologist
 Wayne Angell (born 1930), economist

In sport
 Bjarne Angell (1888–1938), Norwegian tennis player
 Brett Angell (born 1968), English association football coach
 Darren Angell (born 1967), English football defender
 Don Angell (born 1929), boxer and manager
 Henrik Angell (1861–1922), Norwegian military officer, sportsman, and writer
 Jim Angell (1883–1960), English footballer
 Les Angell (1922–2014), English cricketer
 Martin F. Angell (1878–1930), American football and baseball coach and physics and mathematics professor
 Nicholas Angell (born 1979), American professional ice hockey player
 Peter Angell (1932–1979), football defender
 Simon Angell (born 1970), New Zealand rugby league footballer
 Tommy Angell (born 1924), American fencer

In other fields
 George Thorndike Angell (1823–1909), founder of the American Humane Education Society, philanthropist, criminologist
 Israel Angell (1740–1832), soldier of the American Revolutionary War
 Katharine Cramer Angell (1890–1983), a founder of the Culinary Institute of America
 Kenneth Angell (1930–2016), American Roman Catholic bishop
 Lorentz Mortensen Angell (1626–1697), merchant and landowner in Norway
 Mary Ann Angell (1808–1882), wife of Latter Day Saint leader Brigham Young
 Thomas Angell (1618–1694), founding settler of Providence, Rhode Island

Families
 Angell (family), in Norway

See also
 Angell (disambiguation)
 Angel (disambiguation)